Bert Walker or Herbert Walker may refer to:

Herbert Walker (architect) (1846–1937), architect and surveyor in Nottingham
Herbert Ashcombe Walker (1868–1949), British railway manager
Laudie Walker (Herbert Franklin Walker, 1898–1962), American baseball player
Bert Walker (politician) (1919–2008), New Zealand politician
George Herbert Walker III (1931–2020), aka Bert Walker, US Ambassador to Hungary
Herbert Walker, former Governor of the Bank of Jamaica

See also
Hubert Walker, American football player
Albert Walker (disambiguation)
Robert Walker (disambiguation)
George Herbert Walker (disambiguation)
Bert (disambiguation)
Walker (disambiguation)
 Walker (surname)